The "Dnipropetrovsk Mafia" was the name given to an informal group of Soviet politicians who held high office while Leonid Brezhnev was First Secretary or General Secretary of the Communist Party of the Soviet Union (CPSU) in 1964–82, whom he knew from his time as a provincial party official in 1946–56.

The group took its name from the Dnipropetrovsk region of Ukraine, where Leonid Brezhnev began his political career after graduating from the Dnipropetrovsk Metallurgical Institute. He was First Secretary of the Zaporizhzhia Oblast regional party committee in 1946–48, the Dnipropetrovsk party committee in 1948–50, and the Central Committee of the Communist Party of Moldavia in 1950–52. Most members of the 'mafia' were pensioned off – or, in a few cases, arrested – either soon after Brezhnev died, in 1982, or when Mikhail Gorbachev took over as General Secretary of the CPSU in 1985.

Members 

 Leonid Brezhnev, General-Secretary of the Communist Party 1964–1982.
 Konstantin Chernenko, General-Secretary of the Communist Party following Yuri Andropov's death, 1984–1985.
 Nikolai Tikhonov, Premier of the Soviet Union 1980–1985.
 Andrei Kirilenko, Secretary of the CPSU Central Committee 1966–76.
 Volodymyr Shcherbytsky, First Secretary of the Communist Party of Ukraine 1972–89.
 Viktor Chebrikov, Deputy Chairman of the KGB 1968–82, Chairman of the KGB 1982–1988.
 Semyon Tsvigun, First Deputy Chairman of the KGB 1967–1982.
 Nikolai Shchelokov, Minister of Interior 1966–1982.
 Georgi Tsinev, Deputy Chairman of the KGB 1970–82.
 Veniamin Dymshits, Chairman of Gosplan 1962–85.
 Konstantin Grushevoi, head of the political administration of the Moscow Military District 1965–1982.
 Ivan Novikov, Deputy Chairman of the USSR Council of Ministers responsible for the construction industry 1962–1983.
 Georgi Pavlov, Chief of Administration of the Central Committee of the CPSU 1965–1983.
 Georgi Tsukanov, Personal Assistant to the General Secretary of the Central Committee, (i.e. head of Brezhnev's private office) 1966–1983.
 Sergei Trapeznikov, head of the Science and Education Department of the Central Committee of the CPSU, 1965–1983.

References 

Dnipro
Communist Party of the Soviet Union
Leonid Brezhnev
Politics of Ukraine
Leonid Kuchma
Yulia Tymoshenko